Bruce Elliot Tapper (born in the United States) is a social anthropologist, journalist,  writer, and editor. He has published numerous articles on Telugu society and culture in Andhra Pradesh, and shadow puppets as a form of entertainment. He lived in a small village called Aripaka, close to  Visakhapatnam, from 1970-72 to research the social structure and religious customs of the farmers and various other occupational communities in the village.

Education
He obtained his B.A. in anthropology in 1996 and M.A. in Indian studies in 1968, both from the University of Wisconsin–Madison. He obtained his Ph.D. in social anthropology in 1976 from the School of Oriental and African Studies, University of London. He first conducted research in India as a member of the University of Wisconsin–Madison College year in India Programme 1966-67, at Osmania University, Hyderabad. He was awarded a Fulbright-Hays Grant for his doctoral research in Andhra Pradesh, which he carried out in 1970-72 while affiliated with Andhra University, Waltair (Visakhapatnam).

Career
Tapper taught social anthropology at the University of Adelaide, South Australia in 1976-77. He then returned to the United States, where he became a seminar associate of the Southern Asian Institute, Columbia University, New York City. After obtaining an M.Sc. in journalism from the Columbia University Graduate School of Journalism in 1980, he moved to Washington, D.C., where he became a writer, reporter, researcher and editor. He was an editor at the Smithsonian Resident Associates Program in the early 1980s and then had a career as an editor at the Library of Congress, the Smithsonian's Freer and Sackler Galleries (National Museum of Asian Art), the American Occupational Therapy Association, and the United States Holocaust Memorial Museum. He is currently retired.

Publications
Tapper has published articles on several aspects of Andhra society, and conducted research and written on traditional Andhra shadow puppetry.

See also
Culture of Andhra Pradesh

References

Living people
1945 births
American anthropologists
Alumni of SOAS University of London
University of Wisconsin–Madison College of Letters and Science alumni
Columbia University Graduate School of Journalism alumni